Suhas and Sharfu are an Indian screenwriter duo working in Malayalam cinema. They wrote a total of five films, beginning with Varathan in 2018.

Career 
They were both engineers before their film careers and met through the short film network and social media. Suhas is from Thripunithura and Sharfu from Kozhikode. Suhas and Sharfu were assistant director and associate director respectively for the 2018 film Sudani From Nigeria. Through Sameer Thahir, one of the producers of the movie, they met Amal Neerad. Suhas said in an interview about their first movie, "We had approached Amal Neerad with another script, that didn’t work out instead Varathan came to be." The movie was well received. The Hindu wrote, "The screenplay by the Suhas–Sharfu duo is solid. They vividly etch different shades of misogyny, voyeurism and ensuing paranoia and drama, something every woman can relate to."

After the commercial success of Varathan, the director Aashiq Abu invited them to co-write the screenplay of Virus with Muhsin Parari. The movie was set against the backdrop of the 2018 Nipah virus outbreak in Kerala. The movie received critical acclaim and was a box office success. Film Companion praised the screenplay as "A Screenwriting Miracle".

In March 2020, Suhas and Sharfu joined as co-writers in Karthick Naren's Maaran, starring Dhanush. The film was released on 11 March 2022 to mixed reviews. Their next release was Puzhu, starring Mammootty and Parvathy Thiruvothu. It was the first film directed by Ratheena P. T., from a story by Harshad, writer of the movie Unda. Suhas and Sharfu co-wrote the screenplay with Harshad. A direct-to-digital release, the movie gained critical acclaim.

Their third release in 2022 was Dear Friend, directed by Vineeth Kumar and starring Tovino Thomas. Sharfu and Suhas joined the actor Arjun Lal in his first screenwriting role. The movie was a box office failure, but critics praised its unusual theme and out-of-the-box narrative.

Sharfu is also a lyricist. He wrote the song "'Thonnal'"  for a music video directed by Ahaana Krishna in 2021. He also wrote one song for the 2021 movie Madhuram. In 2022, he wrote the song "'Aalum Thee'"  for the movie Jana Gana Mana. He is the lyricist of the upcoming movie Jackson Bazaar Youth, produced by Zakariya Mohammed.

Filmography

References

External links 
 
 

Indian screenwriters
Indian male screenwriters
Indian screenwriting duos